Herbert Michael Shircore, CIE was an Armenian businessman and former Chairman of Narayanganj municipality.

Biography

Shircore was born in 1874 in Kolkata. He moved to Narayanganj to work as the manager of an Armenian owned jute mill. His father was Stephen Arratoon Shircore. He studied at the Doveton College, Calcutta.

Shircore founded G.M. Shircore and Sons, a departmental store in Narayanganj that sold European products. He also founded a horse carriage business. He was elected Chairman of Narayanganj municipality. He received an honour as a Companion of the Order of the Indian Empire in 1933 as part of the 1933 Birthday Honours.

References

1874 births
Companions of the Order of the Indian Empire
People from Narayanganj District
Mayors of Narayanganj
Indian people of Armenian descent
Year of death missing
Businesspeople in British India